The 2010 WAFF Championship was the 6th edition of the West Asian Football Federation Championship, an international tournament for selected West Asian countries and territories. It was hosted by Jordan, after Lebanon was deemed not capable of hosting. The competition was eventually won for the first time by Kuwait, after beating defending champions, Iran.

Draw
Nine teams entered the tournament and were drawn into three groups of three teams. The draw for the competition was made on Thursday 1 July 2010.

Venue

Squads

Group stage

Group A

Group B

Group C

Ranking of second-placed teams

Knockout phase

Semi-finals

Final

Champion

Goalscorers
4 goals

  Ali Al-Nono

3 goals

  Mustafa Karim

2 goals

  Ismaeel Abdullatif
  Hadi Aghili
  Milad Meydavoudi
  Hassan Abdel-Fattah
  Yousef Nasser

1 goal

  Mohammad Gholami
  Jalal Hosseini
  Mehrdad Oladi
  Andranik Teymourian
  Nashat Akram
  Hawar Mulla Mohammed
  Samal Saeed
  Abdullah Deeb
  Soud Al-Magmed
  Abdul-Aziz Al-Mashaan
  Hussain Al-Moussawi
  Ahmed Saad Al-Rashidi
  Mohammed Rashed
  Yaqoob Abdul-Karim
  Osama Hadid
  Suleiman Obeid
  Ahmad Omaier
  Mohamed Al Zeno
  Haitham Thabit

Sponsors
Fly Emirates 
Nike
Toshiba
Nikon 
Epson
Arabic and Iranian Sponsors

References

External links
Official Website
Schedule & results
RSSSF Page on the tournament

2010
2010 in Asian football
2010
2010–11 in Bahraini football
2010–11 in Iraqi football
2010–11 in Iranian football
2010–11 in Jordanian football
2010–11 in Kuwaiti football
2010–11 in Omani football
2010–11 in Palestinian football
2010–11 in Syrian football
2010–11 in Yemeni football